Bernard Scott Gaudi (born February 19, 1974) is an American astronomer, exoplanet hunter, and astropolitician. He is the Thomas Jefferson Professor for Discovery and Space Exploration, a Professor of Astronomy, and Chair of Undergraduate Studies at and Vice Chair of The Ohio State University Department of Astronomy. He was chair of the NASA Exoplanet Exploration Program Analysis Group (2012–2014) and the NASA Astrophysics Advisory Committee (2012–2014).  In 2018, Gaudi was co-chair of the National Academy of Sciences Exoplanet Science Strategy study.

Background 
Prof. Gaudi grew up in a small rural town in Illinois of less than 5000 people called Staunton, which is situated about an hour northeast of St. Louis.  He received his high school diploma from the Illinois Mathematics and Science Academy, his Bachelors of Science in Astrophysics from the Michigan State University, and his PhD in Astronomy from The Ohio State University.  

Gaudi has been a faculty member of the Ohio State University Department of Astronomy since 2006. He previously was a Menzel Fellow at Harvard College Observatory in Cambridge, Massachusetts, and a Hubble Fellow at the Institute for Advanced Study in Princeton, NJ. 

Dr. Gaudi was the recipient of the Helen B. Warner Prize of the American Astronomical Society in 2009, won a National Science Foundation CAREER Award, a Presidential Early Career Award in Science and Engineering (PECASE) in 2012, and received NASA's Outstanding Public Leadership Medal in 2017.

Gaudi is single, and self-identifies as a gay man. He has worked to bring equality to underrepresented groups in astronomy and to eliminate harassment of all kinds, and has fostered engagement in astronomy among LGBTQ and HIV-impacted youth.

Academic research 
Gaudi is a leader in the discovery and statistical characterization of extrasolar planets using a variety of methods, including transits and gravitational microlensing. In 2008, he and his collaborators announced the discovery of the first Jupiter/Saturn analog using microlensing. In 2017, as one of the three Co-PIs, he led the Kilodegree Extremely Little Telescope ground-based survey collaboration in announcing the discovery of KELT-9b, the hottest transiting gas giant ever discovered.  

Gaudi's first major media appearance was in Discover, when the magazine named him one of “20 Young Scientists to Watch in the Next 20 Years.” He has since moved to the forefront of worldwide planet-hunting collaborations, where he frequently coordinates the efforts of astronomers around the globe. Gaudi has helped discover over fifty planets with several techniques, with his work earning him coverage in the New York Times, Washington Post, New Scientist, Sky & Telescope, Astronomy and Wired, among others. He gave a TEDxColumbus talk in 2013.

Exoplanet mission development 
Generally, Gaudi is deeply immersed in analytic and numerical techniques for assessing the yield, biases, and discovery potential of current and next-generation surveys to determine the demographics of exoplanets, and has recently turned his attention to developing space telescope concepts that could address one of humanity's most fundamental questions: Is there life elsewhere in the universe? He is a member of the Formulation Science Working Group for NASA’s Nancy Grace Roman Space Telescope and is currently co-community chair of NASA's Habitable Exoplanet Imaging Mission study.

References

Ohio State University faculty
Living people
People from Staunton, Illinois
Michigan State University alumni
Ohio State University Graduate School alumni
American astronomers
1974 births
Harvard College Observatory people
LGBT people from Illinois
American LGBT scientists
Gay academics
Gay scientists